Stereocrea is a genus of fungi within the Clavicipitaceae family.

References

External links
Index Fungorum

Hypocreales genera
Clavicipitaceae